Labinsky District is an administrative district (raion), one of the thirty-eight in Krasnodar Krai, Russia. As a municipal division, it is incorporated as Labinsky Municipal District. It is located in the southeast of the krai. Its administrative center is the town of Labinsk (which is not administratively a part of the district). Population:

Administrative and municipal status
Within the framework of administrative divisions, Labinsky District is one of the thirty-eight in the krai. The town of Labinsk serves as its administrative center, despite being incorporated separately as an administrative unit with the status equal to that of the districts (and which, in addition to Labinsk, also includes two rural localities).

As a municipal division, the district is incorporated as Labinsky Municipal District, with the Town of Labinsk being incorporated within it as Labinskoye Urban Settlement.

References

Notes

Sources

Districts of Krasnodar Krai
